Huntington High School may refer to:

Huntington High School (Shreveport, Louisiana)
Huntington High School (New York), Huntington, New York
Huntington High School (Ohio), Chillicothe, Ohio
Huntington High School (Texas), Huntington, Texas
Huntington High School (West Virginia), Huntington, West Virginia
Old Huntington High School, one of the two Huntington, West Virginia schools that consolidated in 1996
Collis P. Huntington High School, Newport News, Virginia

See also
Huntington North High School, Indiana
Huntingtown High School, Huntingtown, Maryland
Huntington School (Oregon), Huntington, Oregon